The 2015–16 Utah Valley Wolverines women's basketball team represents Utah Valley University in the 2015–16 college basketball season. Cathy Nixon enters the season as head coach for the 20th consecutive season. The Wolverines play their home games at the UCCU Center and the PE Building as members of the WAC. They finished the season 16–15, 8–6 in WAC play to finish in a 3 tie for third place. They advanced to the semifinals of the WAC women's tournament where they lost to New Mexico State.

Roster

Schedule and results

|-
!colspan=8 style="background:#284E36; color:#FFFFFF;"| Exhibition

|-
!colspan=8 style="background:#284E36; color:#FFFFFF;"| Non-conference regular season

|-
!colspan=8 style="background:#284E36; color:#FFFFFF;"| WAC regular season

|-
!colspan=8 style="background:#284E36; color:#FFFFFF;"| WAC Women's Tournament

See also
2015–16 Utah Valley Wolverines men's basketball team

References

Utah Valley Wolverines women's basketball seasons
Utah Valley